Aricoris is a genus in the butterfly family Riodinidae present in the Neotropical realm.

Species 
Aricoris aurinia (Hewitson, [1863]) present in Uruguay and Brazil
Aricoris campestris (Bates, 1868) present in Brazil
Aricoris caracensis (Callaghan, 2001) present in Brazil
Aricoris chilensis (C. & R. Felder, 1865) present in Bolivia, Uruguay, Chile and Argentina
Aricoris cinericia (Stichel, 1910) present in Uruguay and Argentina
Aricoris colchis (C. & R. Felder, 1865) present in Brazil
Aricoris constantius (Fabricius, 1793) present in Brazil
Aricoris domina (Bates, 1865) present in Panama and Costa Rica
Aricoris epulus (Cramer, [1775]) present in Suriname, Argentina and Brazil
Aricoris erostratus (Westwood, 1851) present in Panama, Colombia and Venezuela
Aricoris gauchoana (Stichel, 1910) present in Uruguay
Aricoris hubrichi (Stichel, 1926) present in Uruguay and Argentina
Aricoris incana (Stichel, 1910) present in Peru and Argentina
Aricoris indistincta (Lathy, 1932) present in Uruguay and Argentina
Aricoris middletoni (Sharpe, 1890) present in Brazil
Aricoris montana (Schneider, 1937) present in Uruguay and Argentina
Aricoris notialis (Stichel, 1910) present in Argentina
Aricoris propitia (Stichel, 1910) present in Brazil
Aricoris signata (Stichel, 1910) present in Brazil
Aricoris terias Godman, 1903 present in Paraguay and Argentina
Aricoris zachaeus (Fabricius, 1798) present in French Guiana

Sources 
funet
TOL image, implied clade.

Nymphidiini
Riodinidae of South America
Butterfly genera
Taxa named by John O. Westwood